The 1966 St. John's Redmen baseball team represented the St. John's University in the 1966 NCAA University Division baseball season. The Redmen played their home games at Alley Pond Park. The team was coached by Jack Kaiser in his St. John's University in his 11th year at St. John's.

The Redmen won District II to advance to the College World Series, where they were defeated by the Oklahoma State Cowboys.

Roster

Schedule 

! style="" | Regular Season
|- valign="top" 

|- align="center" bgcolor="#ccffcc"
| 1 || March 26 ||  || Alley Pond Park • New York, New York || 22–3 || 1–0
|- align="center" bgcolor="#ccffcc"
| 2 || March 30 ||  || Alley Pond Park • New York, New York || 7–2 || 2–0
|- align="center" bgcolor="#ccffcc"
| 3 || March 31 || C.W. Post || Alley Pond Park • New York, New York || 9–0 || 3–0
|-

|- align="center" bgcolor="#ccffcc"
| 4 || April 1 || at  || Alley Pond Park • New York, New York || 4–3 || 4–0
|- align="center" bgcolor="#ffcccc"
| 5 || April 6 ||  || Alley Pond Park • New York, New York || 1–2 || 4–1
|- align="center" bgcolor="#ccffcc"
| 6 || April 7 ||  || Alley Pond Park • New York, New York || 12–3 || 5–1
|- align="center" bgcolor="#ccffcc"
| 7 || April 9 || at  || Unknown • New York, New York || 15–7 || 6–1
|- align="center" bgcolor="#ccffcc"
| 8 || April 11 ||  || Alley Pond Park • New York, New York || 15–0 || 7–1
|- align="center" bgcolor="#ccffcc"
| 9 || April 12 ||  || Alley Pond Park • New York, New York || 2–1 || 8–1
|- align="center" bgcolor="#ffcccc"
| 10 || April 14 || at  || Unknown • New Haven, Connecticut || 1–9 || 8–2
|- align="center" bgcolor="#ccffcc"
| 11 || April 15 ||  || Alley Pond Park • New York, New York || 6–1 || 9–2
|- align="center" bgcolor="#ccffcc"
| 12 || April 16 ||  || Alley Pond Park • New York, New York || 3–1 || 10–2
|- align="center" bgcolor="#ccffcc"
| 13 || April 19 ||  || Alley Pond Park • New York, New York || 8–6 || 11–2
|- align="center" bgcolor="#ccffcc"
| 14 || April 21 ||  || Alley Pond Park • New York, New York || 2–0 || 12–2
|- align="center" bgcolor="#ccffcc"
| 15 || April 22 ||  || Alley Pond Park • New York, New York || 11–2 || 13–2
|- align="center" bgcolor="#ccffcc"
| 16 || April 23 || at  || Unknown • New York, New York || 7–0 || 14–2
|- align="center" bgcolor="#ccffcc"
| 17 || April 26 ||  || Alley Pond Park • New York, New York || 3–2 || 15–2
|- align="center" bgcolor="#ccffcc"
| 18 || April 27 || at  || University Field • Hempstead, New York || 12–3 || 16–2
|- align="center" bgcolor="#ccffcc"
| 19 || April 30 || at  || Unknown • New Rochelle, New York || 3–1 || 17–2
|-

|- align="center" bgcolor="#ffcccc"
| 20 || May 3 || at  || Owen T. Carroll Field • South Orange, New Jersey || 4–5 || 17–3
|- align="center" bgcolor="#ffcccc"
| 21 || May 7 || at  || Unknown • Teaneck, New Jersey || 0–1 || 17–4
|- align="center" bgcolor="#ffcccc"
| 22 || May 10 || at  || Doubleday Field • West Point, New York || 0–10 || 17–5
|- align="center" bgcolor="#ccffcc"
| 23 || May 11 ||  || Alley Pond Park • New York, New York || 13–3 || 18–5
|- align="center" bgcolor="#ccffcc"
| 24 || May 12 ||  || Alley Pond Park • New York, New York || 1–0 || 19–5
|- align="center" bgcolor="#ffcccc"
| 25 || May 14 ||  || Van Cortlandt Park • New York, New York || 2–4 || 19–6
|- align="center" bgcolor="#ffcccc"
| 26 || May 15 || at  || Alley Pond Park • Lawrenceville, New Jersey || 4–7 || 19–7
|- align="center" bgcolor="#ccffcc"
| 27 || May 17 ||  || Alley Pond Park • New York, New York || 9–0 || 20–7
|-

|-
! style="" | Postseason
|- valign="top"

|- align="center" bgcolor="#ccffcc"
| 28 || June 3 || vs Rutgers || Bill Clarke Field • Princeton, New Jersey || 9–4 || 21–7
|- align="center" bgcolor="#ccffcc"
| 29 || June 5 || vs  || Bill Clarke Field • Princeton, New Jersey || 2–0 || 22–7
|- align="center" bgcolor="#ccffcc"
| 30 || June 5 || vs Lafayette || Bill Clarke Field • Princeton, New Jersey || 8–3 || 23–7
|-

|- align="center" bgcolor="#ccffcc"
| 31 || June 13 || vs  || Johnny Rosenblatt Stadium • Omaha, Nebraska || 5–3 || 24–7
|- align="center" bgcolor="#ccffcc"
| 32 || June 14 || vs Texas || Johnny Rosenblatt Stadium • Omaha, Nebraska || 2–0 || 25–7
|- align="center" bgcolor="#ffcccc"
| 33 || June 15 || vs Ohio State || Johnny Rosenblatt Stadium • Omaha, Nebraska || 7–8 || 25–8
|- align="center" bgcolor="#ffcccc"
| 34 || June 17 || vs Oklahoma || Johnny Rosenblatt Stadium • Omaha, Nebraska || 1–6 || 25–9
|-

Awards and honors 
Matt Galante
 All Tournament Team

Joe Russo
 All Tournament Team

References 

St. John's Red Storm baseball seasons
St. John's Redmen baseball
College World Series seasons